Ken Harper (15 April 1917 – February 1994) was an English professional footballer who played as a full back, making 50 appearances in the Football League between 1946 and 1949 for Bradford City.

References

1917 births
1994 deaths
English footballers
Walsall F.C. players
Bradford City A.F.C. players
English Football League players
Association football defenders